The GP Stad Roeselare is an elite women's road bicycle race held annually in Roeselare, Belgium. The race is established in 2007 and is rated by the UCI as a 1.1 category race.

Past winners 

Source:

References

External links
 

 
Recurring sporting events established in 2007
Cycle races in Belgium
2007 establishments in Belgium
Women's road bicycle races
Sport in Roeselare